An election to Northamptonshire County Council took place on 2 May 2013 as part of the 2013 United Kingdom local elections. Following a boundary review, the number of county councillors was reduced from 73 to 57 from this election. All members were elected by first-past-the-post voting from single-member electoral divisions for a four-year term of office. The Conservative Party held on to their overall majority, having held overall control of the council since 2005.

All locally registered electors (British, Irish, Commonwealth and European Union citizens) who were aged 18 or over on Thursday 2 May 2013 were entitled to vote in the local elections. Those who were temporarily away from their ordinary address (for example, away working, on holiday, in student accommodation or in hospital) were also entitled to vote in the local elections, although those who had moved abroad and registered as overseas electors cannot vote in the local elections. It is possible to register to vote at more than one address (such as a university student who had a term-time address and lives at home during holidays) at the discretion of the local Electoral Register Office, but it remains an offence to vote more than once in the same local government election.

Summary
The election saw the Conservatives maintain overall control of the council with a reduced majority of 8 seats. The Labour Party regained their status as the council's official opposition group with 11 seats, a net gain of five. The Liberal Democrats had 6 members elected, a net loss of three. UKIP achieved 3 council seats, while one independent candidate was elected.

Results

Results by Division

Corby

Daventry

†Trade Unions and Socialists against cuts

†Trade Unions and Socialists against cuts

†Trade Unions and Socialists against cuts

East Northamptonshire

Kettering

Northampton

†Trade Unions & Socialists against cuts

†Northampton Save our Services

South Northamptonshire

Wellingborough

Interim By-elections and Defections
Between 2009 and 2013, the only change to council composition were defections from the Conservatives who lost four councillors: one to UKIP, one to the Liberal Democrats and two went independent.

Notes and references
Notes 
 
References

2013 English local elections
2013
2010s in Northamptonshire